John Esmond Birnie (born 6 January 1965) is an economist, author and former politician. He was an Ulster Unionist Party (UUP) Member of the Northern Ireland Assembly (MLA) for Belfast South from 1998 until 2007. Birnie was born in Edinburgh, Scotland. He attended Ballymena Primary School and later Ballymena Academy. He studied Economics at Gonville and Caius College, Cambridge before completing a PhD at Queen’s University Belfast.

He was an unsuccessful  Conservative Party candidate in the elections to Belfast City Council for Balmoral in the 1993 Northern Ireland Local Election. In the 2005 Northern Ireland Local Election, he stood again for Balmoral, this time for the Ulster Unionist Party, and failed to get elected by 0.95 votes on the final count. Birnie was also second on the Conservative regional list for the 1996 Forum Election, but was not elected as the party was 12th most popular in electoral support, and only the top 10 parties were eligible for two top up seats.

He was elected to the Northern Ireland Assembly in 1998. During the Assembly he was Chairman of the Assembly's Employment and Learning Committee. He retained his seat in 2003 but lost it in the 2007 elections.  He was then employed as a special advisor to Employment and Learning Minister, Sir Reg Empey. He is now Chief Economist for PricewaterhouseCoopers in Northern Ireland.

Works 
 
 Firm, Competitiveness and Environmental Regulations: A Study of the European Food Processing Industries by David Hitchens, Esmond Birnie, Angela McGowan, and Ursula Triebswetter (Hardcover - 28 October 1998)
 The Northern Ireland Economy: Performance, Prospects and Policy by Esmond Birnie and D.M.W.N. Hitchens (Hardcover - 23 February 1999)
 Environmental Regulation and Competitive Advantage: A Study of Packaging Waste in the European Supply Chain by David Hitchens, Esmond Birnie, William Thompson, and Ursula Triebswetter (Hardcover - 29 March 2000)

References

External links 
 NI Assembly profile

1965 births
Alumni of Gonville and Caius College, Cambridge
Alumni of Queen's University Belfast
British economists
Living people
Northern Ireland MLAs 1998–2003
Northern Ireland MLAs 2003–2007
Ulster Unionist Party MLAs
Politicians from Edinburgh
Academics of Queen's University Belfast
Academics from Edinburgh